Qaleh (also Romanized as Qal‘eh; also known as Kalekh and Qal‘eh-ye Solţānīyeh) is a village in Soltaniyeh Rural District, Soltaniyeh District, Abhar County, Zanjan Province, Iran. At the 2006 census, its population was 317, in 83 families.

References 

Populated places in Abhar County